Antonis Trimmatis (born 29 April 1999) is a Greek professional footballer who plays as a forward for Super League 2 club Panachaiki, on loan from Atromitos.

References

1999 births
Living people
Greek footballers
Greece youth international footballers
Super League Greece players
Super League Greece 2 players
Gamma Ethniki players
Atromitos F.C. players
Ethnikos Piraeus F.C. players
Egaleo F.C. players
Panachaiki F.C. players
Association football forwards
People from Kos
Sportspeople from the South Aegean
21st-century Greek people